Automorphic Forms on GL(2) is a mathematics book by  where they rewrite Erich Hecke's theory of modular forms in terms of the representation theory of GL(2) over local fields and adele rings of global fields and prove the Jacquet–Langlands correspondence. A second volume by  gives an interpretation of some results by Rankin and Selberg in terms of the representation theory of GL(2) × GL(2).

References

External links

Langlands program
Representation theory
Mathematics books